Crotalus durissus neoleonensis (a taxonomic synonym) may refer to:

 Crotalus simus, a.k.a. the Middle American rattlesnake, a venomous pitviper species found in Mexico and Central America
 Crotalus totonacus, a.k.a. the Totonacan rattlesnake, a venomous pitviper species found in northeastern Mexico